Andøya Air Station is a military air station in Andøy Municipality in Nordland county, Norway.  The station is located near the village of Andenes at the northern end of the island of Andøya in the Vesterålen archipelago. 333 Squadron of the Royal Norwegian Air Force is based here with Lockheed P-3C Orions. The squadron is Norway's only surveillance squadron and stands as the airborne defence of northern Norway. Andøya Air Station is designed to handle fighters and should it become necessary, fighter squadrons can be deployed to protect this region. Squadron 333 is the only Norwegian squadron still in operation after its initial deployment.

The civil airport Andøya Airport, Andenes and the civilian sounding rocket launch facility Andøya Rocket Range are also located on the island.

The primary function of the six Orion aircraft is surveillance, mostly in the North and for both military and civilian functions. The planes are also the only aircraft that can provide assistance to stricken ships far from land. The aircraft frequently cooperate with the Norwegian Coast Guard.

The government voted in 2016 to put new Maritime Patrol Aircraft along with the Lockheed Martin F-35 fighter at Evenes Air Station. Evenes will be strengthened with the establishment of dedicated base defence units and long-range air defences at the same site, so Andøya air station is slated for closure.

History
The first idea of building a military airport was launched at a NATO meeting in Lisbon in 1951. In March 1952 the Norwegian Minister of Defence, Nils Langhelle announced that the airport was going to be built. There were multiple suggested locations, and the decision fell on the village Haugnes. The entire village with 310 residents was expropriated to give enough area for the airport. The community at Andøy only had 2000 residents at the time, and a large growth was expected.

A Douglas Dakota was the first aircraft landing on September 17, 1954. The air station was operational from the fall of 1957. The headquarters were located about 13 km away at Skarsteindalen, as part of NATOs spread tactic. In 1961 the first squadron, the 333, was moved to the air station, from Sola Air Station, with HU-16B Albatross aircraft.

After a period of solely military use, civilian services commenced on April 2, 1964. The first scheduled commercial flight was flown by Scandinavian Airlines with a Metropolitan. In 1968 the second runway was completed. In the 1970s the airport became part of the new network of regional airports in Lofoten and Vesterålen with government subsidised operations using de Havilland DHC-6 Twin Otter aircraft seating 20 and operated by Widerøe.

In 1969 the Albatrosses were replaced by P-3B Orion aircraft. The P-3B lacked the ability to work with the Norwegian Coast Guard, and in 1989 they were sold to the Spanish Air Force. They were replaced with new P-3C aircraft. Following the end of the Cold War in the 1990s the air station has been reduced.

Accidents and incidents
 On February 1, 1982, a Lockheed SR-71, tail number 980, diverted to the airport.  It stayed there four days before being flown out.
 On July 31, 1988, four people died when a private Cessna 172 aircraft crashed west of the airport just after takeoff.

See also
 List of the largest airports in the Nordic countries

References

External links
 Air Force page on Andøya (in Norwegian)

Airports in the Arctic
Royal Norwegian Air Force stations
Airports in Nordland
Andøy
1954 establishments in Norway
Airports established in 1954
Military installations in Nordland